Yasmine Bladelius (born 1988), previously Yasmine Larsson, is a Swedish Social Democratic Party politician.

Political career
Bladelius was first elected member of the Riksdag for the period 2014–2018, from the Skåne Western constituency.

As of 2016, Bladelius served as chairperson of the Swedish Republican Association.

Bladelius was elected as Member of the Riksdag again in September 2022. 

In addition to her committee assignments, Bladelius has been a member of the Swedish delegation to the Parliamentary Assembly of the Council of Europe (PACE) since 2022.

References

1988 births
Living people
Members of the Riksdag from the Social Democrats
Women members of the Riksdag
Members of the Riksdag 2014–2018
Members of the Riksdag 2018–2022
Members of the Riksdag 2022–2026
21st-century Swedish women politicians